The Rihn DR-109 is an American aerobatic homebuilt aircraft that was designed by Dan Rihn. The aircraft was supplied by Jim Kimball Enterprises of Zellwood, Florida and more recently by Ashcraft Aero Works of Aurora, Illinois in the form of plans.  It was designed for competition aerobatics as well as a trainer for the Rihn DR-107 One Design.

Design and development
The DR-109 is a monoplane that features a cantilever low-wing, two seats in a tandem enclosed cockpit under a bubble canopy, fixed conventional landing gear with wheel pants and a single engine in tractor configuration.

The aircraft fuselage is made from welded 4130 steel tubing, covered in sheet aluminum. The tail surfaces feature steel tube spars, sheet aluminum ribs, are covered with doped aircraft fabric and are cable-braced. The  span wing is constructed in one piece and has Douglas fir spars with plywood ribs and covering. The wing has almost full-span ailerons and no flaps.

The standard powerplant used is the  Lycoming AEIO-540-D4A5 six cylinder, air-cooled, four stroke aircraft engine.

The designer estimates the construction time as 1300 hours.

Operational history
In November 2013 11 examples were registered in the United States with the Federal Aviation Administration, with another one previously registered and now removed.

Specifications (DR-109)

See also
List of aerobatic aircraft

References

External links
Photo of a DR-109

DR-109
1990s United States sport aircraft
Single-engined tractor aircraft
Low-wing aircraft
Homebuilt aircraft
Aerobatic aircraft